John of Béthune or Jean de Béthune may refer to:

John of Béthune (died 1219), bishop of Cambrai
John of Béthune (died 1238), jure uxoris count of Saint-Pol

See also
John Bethune (disambiguation)